Oğuzlar may refer to the following places in Turkey:

 Oğuzlar, Babadağ
 Oğuzlar, Bismil
 Oğuzlar, Çorum, district and town
 Oğuzlar, Ortaköy, village
 Oğuzlar, Polatlı, village